Shama Dulari is an actress and dancer. She acted in the 1940s to the early 1950s and is often confused with actresses Shyama and Dulari as her name is separated instead of one word. She has lived in Bombay after her film career ended in 1952.

Filmography

Shahzadi (1941)
Meera Bai (1947)
Shair (1949)
Rangila Rajasthan (1949)
Jan Pahechan (1950)
Nili (1950)
Bhule Bhatke (1952)

References

External links 
 

Indian film actresses
Actresses in Hindi cinema
Actresses from Mumbai
Year of birth missing
Year of death missing